MV Osakana is an open hatch bulk carrier that was built in 2004 by Oshima Shipbuilding as Star Osakana for Masterbulk.

Construction
The ship was launched on 12 February 2004 at Oshima Shipbuilding Co.'s yard in Ōshima, Nagasaki Prefecture as Yard Number 10333.
She is propelled by a MAN B&W 6S60MC  engine which was manufactured by Kawasaki Heavy Industries. Electricity is supplied by three generators; two rated at 1,470 kVA each and one rated at 1,259 kVA. Fuel capacity is  fuel oil and  diesel oil.

These are carried in eleven holds. Accommodation for her 25 crew is at the aft of the ship.

History
Star Osakana was completed on 23 April 2004 for Masterbulk Pte Ltd, the Singapore subsidiary of Norwegian shipping group Westfal-Larsen, for service with joint venture Star Shipping. The IMO Number 9253870 was allocated. Her initial port of registry was Singapore.

When Masterbulk and their partners Grieg Group demerged the Star Shipping business in 2009, she was renamed Osakana and reflagged to the Isle of Man, with Douglas as her port of registry. The MMSI number 235102349 and callsign 2HBU5 were allocated.

In 2014 Masterbulk established a new venture with fellow Norwegian shipowners Saga Ship Holding to operate their fleets of open hatch gantry and jib-craned bulkers in a joint pool, Saga Welco, including Osakana.

References

2004 ships
Ships built by Oshima Shipbuilding
Bulk carriers
Merchant ships of Singapore
Merchant ships of the Isle of Man